Vivace is a musical tempo marking.

Vivace may also refer to:

 VIVACE, an alternative name for Vortex power, a form of hydro power.
 USS Vivace (SP-583), a United States Navy ship. 
 Vivace, a US aerospace company, competed for NASA's Human Landing System